Live at Yoshi's is a 1998 live album by Dee Dee Bridgewater, recorded at Yoshi's Jazz Club in Oakland, California.

Bridgewater sings several songs from her previous album, Dear Ella (1997), a tribute to the jazz singer Ella Fitzgerald, who had died a year previously, and this live album was partly recorded on what would have been Fitzgerald's 81st birthday.

Reception
Robert Christgau commented, "After fruitlessly sampling whatever Bridgewater albums came my way for 25 years, I harbored few hopes that this one would escape decorum, delusions of grandeur, and/or commercial confusion just because it was live. But it does, and then it keeps on going. It's funny, it's sexy, it swings like crazy. Long workouts on 'Slow Boat to China' and 'Love for Sale' show off her fabled chops without dwelling on them. The many extended scats are worthy of Ella herself. Even the gaffe proves her heart is in the right place when she's out there working the crowd--James Brown's 'Sex Machine'." All About Jazz review stated, "Power. Dee Dee Bridgewater is as formidable a vocalist as anyone singing. She is the Jackie Joiner of jazz vocalists. Her athletic style is infectious and she proves she is one of the few who jazz vocalists who can effectively scat and use other Betty Carter-like fireworks."

Track listing
 "Undecided" (Sid Robin, Charlie Shavers) – 8:57
 "(I'd Like to Get You on a) Slow Boat to China" (Frank Loesser) – 6:09
 "Stairway to the Stars" (Matty Malneck, Mitchell Parish, Frank Signorelli) – 7:56
 "What a Little Moonlight Can Do" (Harry M. Woods) – 5:13
 "Get Up (I Feel Like Being A) Sex Machine" (James Brown) – 2:32
 "Midnight Sun" (Sonny Burke, Lionel Hampton, Johnny Mercer) – 7:08
 "Cherokee" (Ray Noble) – 6:14
 "Love for Sale" (vocal melody: Cole Porter, music: Herbie Hancock) – 14:06
 "Cotton Tail" (Duke Ellington) – 9:42

Personnel
 Dee Dee Bridgewater - vocals
 Thierry Eliez - Hammond organ, piano
 Thomas Bramerie - double bass
 Ali Muhammed Jackson - percussion, drums

Chart positions

References

Dee Dee Bridgewater live albums
2000 live albums
Verve Records live albums